Tenente Laurentino Cruz is a municipality in the state of Rio Grande do Norte in the Northeast region of Brazil.

See also 
 List of municipalities in Rio Grande do Norte

References 

Municipalities in Rio Grande do Norte